The 2011 No Surrender was a professional wrestling pay-per-view event produced by Total Nonstop Action Wrestling (TNA) that took place on September 11, 2011, at the Impact Wrestling Zone in Orlando, Florida. It was the seventh annual No Surrender chronology. At the beginning of the event, there was a short memorial to 9/11 victims.

In October 2017, with the launch of the Global Wrestling Network, the event became available to stream on demand.

Storylines

No Surrender featured nine professional wrestling matches that involved different wrestlers from pre-existing scripted feuds and storylines. Wrestlers portrayed villains, heroes, or less distinguishable characters in the scripted events that built tension and culminated in a wrestling match or series of matches.

Going into the night the leaders were as follows: Bully Ray (49), Bobby Roode (42), Gunner (42), and James Storm (40). Bully Ray simply needed to win a match via pinfall or submission in order to continue in the series uncontested.  The other three in the series would require a submission victory to pass Bully Ray if he lost.

Bully Ray defeated James Storm by disqualification and brought him to 52 pts requiring Bobby Roode or Gunner to win by submission in order to tie with Bully Ray and stay alive in the series.  The battle between Bobby Roode and Gunner resulted in Roode getting the submission victory and bringing him to 52 pts tying with Bully Ray.

After Roode’s win Eric Bischoff dictated there will be a winner in the Bound for Glory Series tonight and created a match between Bobby Roode and Bully Ray.  In the newly added match, Bobby Roode defeated Bully Ray making him the #1 Contender for the TNA World Heavyweight Championship at Bound for Glory in Philadelphia.

Results

See also
2011 in professional wrestling

References

External links
Official website

Impact Wrestling No Surrender
2011 in professional wrestling in Florida
Events in Orlando, Florida
Professional wrestling in Orlando, Florida
September 2011 events in the United States
2011 Total Nonstop Action Wrestling pay-per-view events